Millennium Plaza Park is an urban park in Lake Oswego, Oregon, United States. It features a large paved plaza, a fireplace, a reflecting pond, and a pergola, with views of Lakewood Bay. The park opened in 1999, and hosts a farmers' market. It has also been a start and finish site for the annual Lake Run event.

Artworks
 Angkor I

References

External links

 
 

1999 establishments in Oregon
Lake Oswego, Oregon
Urban public parks